The Men's 400 metre individual medley competition of the 2018 European Aquatics Championships was held on 9 August 2018.

Records
Prior to the competition, the existing world and championship records were as follows.

Results

Heats
The heats were started at 09:00.

Final
The final was started at 17:27.

References

Men's 400 metre individual medley